Trearddur Bay United Football Club was a Welsh football team based in Trearddur, Anglesey, Wales. They rose from the Anglesey League in 2008–09 to winning Division One of the Welsh Alliance League at the end of the 2015–16 season. Trearddur bay United merged with Bryngwran Bulls in 2019 to create Trearddur Bay Bulls. This was a short lived affair and the club once again folded in 2020. 

The club finally combined its three sections into one (ladies, juniors, men’s) and re launched under the one heading of Trearddur Bay Football Club.

The club has grown and now offers football to Boys, Girls, The disabled and senior men’s

History
The club joined Saturday league football for 2008–09, and saw success in their first season, winning the North Wales Coast FA Junior Challenge Cup as well as the Anglesey League's Dargie Cup and Thomas & Williams Cup.  The following season saw them obtain more cup success, retaining the Dargie Cup and winning the Elias Cup.  The 2010–11 season saw them win the Anglesey League and three cup competitions, and gain promotion to the Gwynedd League.

The club's first season saw them finish league runners-up and win the Cwpan Gwynedd. The following season they went one better and finished champions of the league, gaining promotion to the Welsh Alliance League Division Two.  The club finished third in the first season in the league and third again the followings season, gaining promotion to Division One.  The next season saw the club win Division One at their first attempt but they were denied promotion to the Cymru Alliance, as their ground did not meet the required criteria to qualify for promotion.

In June 2017 a new management team of former manager, Chris Davies and Nathan Owen took over. The following July the club withdrew from the Welsh Alliance League, planning to take a year out.

In August 2019 the club merged with Bryngwran Bulls to form Trearddur Bay Bulls''.

Honours
Welsh Alliance League Division One
Champions (1): 2015–16
Gwynedd League
Champions (1): 2012–13
Runners-up (1): 2011–12
Anglesey League
Champions (3): 2010–11
North Wales Coast FA Junior Challenge Cup
Winners (1): 2008–09
Runners-up (1): 2014–15 (reserves)
Dargie Cup
Winners (4): 1991–92, 2008–09, 2009–10, 2010–11
Gwynedd Cup (Cwpan Gwynedd)
Winners (1): 2011–12
Megan Cup
Winners (2): 1990–91, 2010–11
Elias Cup
Winners (1): 2009–10
Thomas and Williams Cup
Winners (2): 2008–09, 2010–11

References

Sport in Anglesey
Gwynedd League clubs
Anglesey League clubs
Welsh Alliance League clubs
Trearddur
Association football clubs disestablished in 2019
2019 disestablishments in Wales
Defunct football clubs in Wales